Akshak (Sumerian: , akšak) was a city of ancient Sumer, situated on the northern boundary of Akkad, sometimes identified with Babylonian Upi (Greek Opis).

History
Akshak first appears in records of ca. 2500 BC. In the Sumerian text Dumuzid's dream, Dumuzid king of Uruk is said to have been toppled from his opulence by a hungry mob composed of men from the major cities of Sumer, including Akshak. Another king of Uruk, Enshakushanna, is recorded as having plundered Akshak. Following this, Akshak was at war with Lagash, and was captured by Eannatum, who claims in one inscription to have smitten its king, Zuzu. The Sumerian king list mentions Unzi, Undalulu, Urur, Puzur-Nirah, Ishu-Il and Shu-Sin as kings of Akshak. Puzur-Nirah is also mentioned in the Weidner Chronicle as reigning in Akshak when a female tavern-keeper, Kug-bau of Kish, was appointed overlordship over Sumer. Akshak was also mentioned in tablets found at Ebla. In ca. 2350 BC, Akshak fell into the hands of Lugalzagesi of Umma. The Akkadian king Shar-Kali-Sharri reports defeating the Elamites in a battle at Akshak. The city was also mentioned in an Old Babylonian period tablet found at Sippar-Amnanum.

Location
Its exact location is uncertain. Classical writers located it where the Tigris and Euphrates rivers are closest together and it was mentioned along with Kish in early records. Archaeologists in the 1900s placed Akshak at the site of Tel Omar (or Tel Umar) where a pair of sites straddles the Tigris, but that turned out to be Seleucia (possibly earlier Upi/Opis) when it was excavated by LeRoy Waterman of the American Schools of Oriental Research,. Initially it was thought that two inscriptions bearing the name of Akshak were found there but after examination that proved not the case. Michael C. Astour placed it on the Tigris, on what is now the southern outskirts of Baghdad.

List of rulers of Akshak

See also
Cities of the ancient Near East

References

Further reading
L Waterman, Preliminary report upon the excavation at Tel Umar, Iraq: conducted by the University of Michigan and the Toledo museum of art, University of Michigan press, 1931

Sumerian cities
Former populated places in Iraq
Archaeological sites in Iraq
Former kingdoms